Garfield Township is a township in Dickinson County, Kansas, USA.  As of the 2000 census, its population was 189.

Geography
According to the USGS, it contains one cemetery, Green Lawn.

Further reading

References

 USGS Geographic Names Information System (GNIS)

External links
 City-Data.com

Townships in Dickinson County, Kansas
Townships in Kansas